PKL is an acronym for Pro Kabaddi League, a men's professional Kabaddi league of India.

It may also refer to:
 Papert Koenig Lois, an American advertising agency from 1960 to 1969
 PKL, a Digital Cinema Package file type
 PKL, stock ticker symbol for Pioneer Kitchenware
 PKL, the Protestant Church of Luxembourg
 PKL, an alias for the PKLR enzyme
 PKL, Panchkula, Haryana, India